The Battle of Massawa (also known as the First Battle of Massawa) took place from 1977 to 1978 in and around the coastal city of Massawa in Eritrea. The port was besieged by the Eritrean People's Liberation Front (EPLF) against the forces of Ethiopia, and was one of two battles in and around the city.

The battle
By 1977 EPLF soldiers had claimed all of Massawa save the port itself. This included the main road used by the garrison for the transport of supplies from Asmara. Essentially the garrison was cut off by land and under siege.

On 23 December 1977, the EPLF began a strike through an open field towards the salt flats and port. Soviet warships began to shell EPLF-held portions of the town to prevent its occupation by the EPLF, especially the downtown areas. The Ethiopian victory was attributed to the intervention of the Soviet Union on behalf of Ethiopia, and the work of the Ethiopian airforce and naval artillery. This defeat led to a withdrawal, dubbed the strategic withdrawal, into Sahel, the strategic, EPLF-held mountaintops around the town of Nakfa. This battle was also the beginning of direct Soviet involvement in the Eritrean War of Independence, which would continue in other battles.

References

See also
 Battle of Massawa (1990)
 Eritrean War of Independence

Massawa
Massawa
Massawa
Conflicts in 1977
Massawa (1977)
Massawa (1977)
Ethiopia–Soviet Union relations